Jason William Adams (born July 12, 1983) is an American stage and voice-over actor. Raised in Los Angeles, he attended Hamilton High School (Los Angeles) before attaining a degree in Fine Arts from the University of California, Santa Cruz. He is most recently known for his portrayal of Tom in Overtone Industries' new-age opera Songs & Dances of Imaginary Lands. Alongside cinematographer Adam Jaffe, he co-founded the multi-media production company Spontaneous Combustions. His work as a recording artist under the alias 'Sloppy J' highlights their projects.References

External links
 Spontaneous Combustions http://www.spontaneouscombustions.com
 Video of SloppyJ's ThereAfter'', feat. Rocmon http://www.ebaumsworld.com/video/watch/80734133
 Fine Art Portfolio Sample http://www.fastpencil.com/portfolios/44-drawings-paintings

Living people
1983 births